Eagle Harbor Light is an operational lighthouse at Eagle Harbor, in Keweenaw County in the state of Michigan. It sits on the rocky entrance to Eagle Harbor and is one of several light stations that guide mariners on Lake Superior across the northern edge of the Keweenaw Peninsula.  The original lighthouse, built in 1851, was replaced in 1871 by the present red brick structure, which is a Michigan State Historic Site and listed on the National Register of Historic Places.

History

Edward Taylor was the first to realize the commercial potential of Eagle Harbor, building a short timber pier in the bay in 1844 from which to supply the growing number of miners in the area. A rocky ledge with only eight feet of water above it spread across the harbor entry, and represented a barrier to vessels of deep draft. However, the copper boom saw an increasing number of vessels visiting the dock, and Taylor began to lobby for federal funding for improving the entry into the harbor.

The original Eagle Harbor Light was built in 1851. The structure took the form of a rubble stone keeper's dwelling with a square white-painted wooden tower integrated into one end of the roof. The tower was capped with an octagonal wooden lantern with multiple glass panes, and outfitted with an array of Lewis lamps with reflectors.

By 1865, a total of four new Keepers had worked at the station, with two of them removed from office, one resigning, and one passing away after only seven months at the station. The structure was deteriorating and was replaced in 1871 using a design that had previously been used for Chambers Island Lighthouse in Wisconsin; and McGulpin Point Light in 1868. It was thereafter used at White River Light in 1875; and Sand Island Light (Wisconsin) in 1881. The Lighthouse was manned by a head keeper and two assistant keepers.

In 1999 the Congress of the United States transferred ownership of the Eagle Harbor Light Station to the Keweenaw County Historical Society. The Coast Guard continues to operate the light at the top of the tower.

Museums
The Keweenaw County Historical Society operates the lighthouse as a museum, and also operates other museums at the site, including the Maritime Museum in the old fog signal building, the Commercial Fishing Museum, the Keweenaw History Museum and an exhibit on the 1926 shipwreck of the City of Bangor.

See also
 Lighthouses in the United States

Notes

External links

 Keweenaw County Historical Society - Eagle Harbor Lighthouse and Museums - official website
 Aerial photos, Eagle Harbor Lighthouse, marinas.com
 Detroit News, Interactive map on Michigan lighthouses

Lighthouses completed in 1851
Houses completed in 1851
Lighthouses completed in 1871
Houses completed in 1871
Museums in Keweenaw County, Michigan
Lighthouses in Keweenaw County, Michigan
Lighthouse museums in Michigan
Lighthouses on the National Register of Historic Places in Michigan
Keweenaw National Historical Park
1851 establishments in Michigan
National Register of Historic Places in Keweenaw County, Michigan